For people with the surname, see Jois (surname).

Jois is a small town in the district of Neusiedl am See in Burgenland in Eastern Austria.  It is on the northern shore of Lake Neusiedl, which straddles the border with Hungary.

The picturesque wine-producing area is popular with tourists, who visit Jois's parish church with its Baroque statues dating back to 1757, the local heritage museum with the district's school museum, wayside shrines, cycling trails, and the wine trail.

Population

References

External links
www.jois.info (in German)
Map: location of Jois
Museum Jois (in German)

Cities and towns in Neusiedl am See District